Den Helder is a Terminus railway station in the naval town of Den Helder, The Netherlands. The station opened on 20 December 1865, and is the most northerly station in North Holland. The station is the start of the Den Helder–Amsterdam railway. The original station building was demolished in 1958 and a new building was built, a bit further south than the previous one.

The railway line was electrified in 1958. The station now has three platforms. The services are operated by Nederlandse Spoorwegen.

In 1980 another station in the town, Den Helder Zuid, opened.

Train services
The station is served by the following service(s):

2x per hour Intercity services Den Helder - Amsterdam - Utrecht - Nijmegen

Bus services
The station is served by the following bus services:

External links
NS website 
Dutch public transport travel planner 

Railway stations in North Holland
Railway stations opened in 1865
Railway stations on the Staatslijn K
Den Helder